The Druk Gyaltsuen (lit. Dragon Queen) is the Queen consort of the Kingdom of Bhutan. In the Dzongkha language, Bhutan is known as Drukyul which translates as "The Land of the Thunder Dragon". Thus, while Queens of Bhutan are known as Druk Gyaltsuen ("Dragon Queen"), the Bhutanese people call themselves the Drukpa, meaning "Dragon people".

The current Queen consort of Bhutan is Jetsun Pema Wangchuck, the 5th Druk Gyaltsuen. She wears the hand-sewn silk Phoenix Crown, which is the official crown worn by the Queens of Bhutan.

She also has a carved jade gold Tiara.

Queen Ashi Jetsun Pema Wangchuck is the youngest consort in the world.

List of Druk Gyaltsuens

See also
 Constitution of Bhutan
 Druk
 Druk Gyalpo
 Dual system of government
 History of Bhutan
 House of Wangchuck
 Politics of Bhutan

References

Royal titles
Lists of queens
Titles of national or ethnic leadership